Biała is a river in eastern central Poland, a right tributary of the Dunajec, which it meets in the town of Tarnów.  Arising in the Laborec Highlands of Slovakia, the river flows through the Polish towns of:

 Zakopane
 Poronin
 Biały Dunajec
 Szaflary
 Nowy Targ

Among its own tributaries is the Wątok.

References 

Rivers of Poland
Rivers of Lesser Poland Voivodeship